Gareth Ewing (born 13 March 1974) is a South African field hockey coach. He coached the South African national team at the 2020 Summer Olympics

Gareth Ewing resigned as his role as head coach of the SA Hockey Men.

References

External links

1974 births
Living people
South African field hockey coaches
Olympic coaches